The 1961 Maine Black Bears football team was an American football team that represented the University of Maine as a member of the Yankee Conference during the 1961 NCAA College Division football season. In its 11th season under head coach Harold Westerman, the team compiled an 8–0–1 record (5–0 against conference opponents) and won the Yankee Conference championship. The team played its home games at Alumni Field in Orono, Maine. Robert Kinney and David Cloutier were the team captains.

Schedule

References

Maine
Maine Black Bears football seasons
Yankee Conference football champion seasons
College football undefeated seasons
Maine Black Bears football